Léonor de Récondo (born 10 August 1976.) is a French violinist and writer.

Biography 
Léonor de Récondo started to learn the violon at age five. She became a baroque violinist, and was a laureate of the international competition of baroque music Van Wassenaer (Netherland) in 2004.

Léonor de Récondo began a career as a writer in 2010 by publishing her first novel, La Grace du cyprès blanc. In 2013, following the publication of her novel Rêves oubliés, she was awarded the Prix littéraire des lycéens et apprentis de Bourgogne.

In 2015, she was awarded the prix des libraires, the Grand prix RTL-Lire. and the following year, the Prix des étudiants francophones, depending on the Young Europeans Literary Award. for her novel .

Literary work 
2010: La Grâce du cyprès blanc, Cognac, France, Éditions Le Temps qu'il fait 103 p. 
2012: Rêves oubliés, Paris, 169 p. . (lauréat du Prix littéraire des lycéens et apprentis de Bourgogne en 2013)
2013: Pietra viva, Paris, Sabine Wespieser Éditeur, 225 p.  - book devoted to Michel-Ange. 
2015: Amours, Paris, Sabine Wespieser Éditeur, 279 p. . Prix des libraires 2015 - Grand prix RTL-Lire 2015. - Prix des étudiants francophones 2016, depending on the Young Europeans Literary Award.

References

External links 
 Le mystère Michel-Ange, par Léonor de Récondo on Le Monde (19 May 2014)
 Léonor de Récondo on Babelio
 Amours, Leonor de Recondo on La cause littéraire
 Léonor de Récondo - Amours on YouTube

French women novelists
21st-century French novelists
Prix des libraires winners
21st-century French women classical violinists
1976 births
Living people
21st-century French women writers